KGSL (95.3 FM, "KG-95.3") is a radio station  broadcasting a Top 40 (CHR) format. Licensed to Winona, Minnesota, United States, the station features programming from Jones Radio Network.

It is owned by Leighton Broadcasting, through licensee Leighton Radio Holdings, Inc., and is located at 752 Bluffview Circle, with its other sister stations.

References

External links
Winona Radio

Radio stations in Minnesota
Radio stations established in 1984
Contemporary hit radio stations in the United States